Pool C of the 2022 Billie Jean King Cup Americas Zone Group II was one of four pools in the Americas zone of the 2022 Billie Jean King Cup. Four teams competed in a round robin competition, with each team proceeding to their respective sections of the play-offs: the top team played for advancement to Group I in 2023.

Standings 

Standings are determined by: 1. number of wins; 2. number of matches; 3. in two-team ties, head-to-head records; 4. in three-team ties, (a) percentage of matches won (head-to-head records if two teams remain tied), then (b) percentage of sets won (head-to-head records if two teams remain tied), then (c) percentage of games won (head-to-head records if two teams remain tied), then (d) Billie Jean King Cup rankings.

Round-robin

Bolivia vs. Puerto Rico

Panama vs. Aruba

Bolivia vs. Panama

Puerto Rico vs. Aruba

Bolivia vs. Aruba

Panama vs. Puerto Rico

References

External links 
 Billie Jean King Cup website

2022 Billie Jean King Cup Americas Zone